Quan is a Chinese and Vietnamese surname.

Quan may also refer to:

Quận, the name for an urban administrative unit in Vietnam
Quan (state), a small Zhou Dynasty vassal state of Central China
Quan, a character in Magicians of Xanth
Quan họ, a Vietnamese folk music singing style

See also
Quanzhou(泉州), a city of Fujian, China
List of people named Quan